Hung Shing Temples or Tai Wong Temples are temples dedicated to Hung Shing Tai Wong. Hung Shing temples have been widely built in southern China, especially Guangdong province and in Hong Kong.

Hong Kong

Existing temples
There are several Hung Shing Temples in Hong Kong, including 6 on Lantau Island and one only in urban Kowloon. The table provides a partial list of these temples. Hung Shing Festivals are celebrated on the 13th day of the 2nd month in Chinese calendar at the Hung Shing Temples in Ap Lei Chau, Tai Kok Tsui, Cheung Chau, Sha Lo Wan and Kau Sai Chau.

Note 1: A territory-wide grade reassessment of historic buildings is ongoing. The grades listed in the table are based on this update (10 September 2013) . The temples with a "Not listed" status in the table below are not graded and do not appear in the list of historic buildings considered for grading.
Note 2: While most probably incomplete, this list is tentatively exhaustive.

Former temples
Several temples have been ruined and have disappeared, including:
 Temple at Mui Wo. Built in the Ming Dynasty, repaired in 1843. Completely disappeared.
 Temple at Pui O. Built in the Ming Dynasty. Ruined as in 1979.
 Temple in Tung Chung, inside Tung Chung Fort. Ruined as in 1979.

Other locations

See also
 Hung Shing (洪聖爺）
 Tin Hau temples in Hong Kong
 Kwan Tai temples in Hong Kong
 Places of worship in Hong Kong

References

Taoist temples in Hong Kong